Charlie Chambers may refer to:

Charlie Chambers, character in Columbo (season 9)
Charlie Chambers, see Longwood Cricket Club

See also
Charles Chambers (disambiguation)